The Boulder Dam is the former name for the Hoover Dam.

Boulder Dam may also refer to:
Boulder Dam (film), a 1936 film starring Ross Alexander, Patricia Ellis and Lyle Talbot
Boulder Dam Hotel, a hotel located in Boulder City, Nevada
Lake Mead National Recreation Area, also called the Boulder Dam Recreation Area
Lost City Museum, formerly called the Boulder Dam Park Museum

See also
Hoover Dam (disambiguation)